Nicolas d’Estienne d’Orves (born 10 September 1974, in Neuilly-sur-Seine) is a French journalist and writer.

Biography 
Nicolas d’Estienne d’Orves is Résistant Henri Honoré d'Estienne d'Orves's grand-nephew .

A former student of hypokhâgne, after internships in cinema and opera, he studied at the Sorbonne.

By an exceptional combination of circumstances, he became the beneficiary of the collaborationist writer Lucien Rebatet. At the age of 22, while writing a master's thesis at the Sorbonne, he discovered his Histoire de la musique and grew passionate about its author. On this occasion, he met Pierre Darrigrand, Rebatet's executor, who before dying of cancer asked him to become, in turn, the beneficiary of the writer.

He has collaborated with Le Figaro littéraire, Madame Figaro, Le Figaro Magazine and Le Spectacle du Monde.

For four and a half years, Nicolas d'Estienne d'Orves hosted a column one Saturday noon per month on the Étonnez-moi Benoît program by Benoît Duteurtre on France Musique. In December 2008, he was terminated by his director  for blasphemy and pornography after broadcasting a bawdy version of the Christmas carol Il est né, le divin Enfant.

He is the author of several short stories, essays and novels, notably Othon ou l'Aurore immobile, crowned with the Prix Roger Nimier in 2002.

Nicolas d’Estienne d’Orves is a chronicler at the Figaroscope, musical critic at Le Figaro and musical chronicler for the magazine Classica. He regularly collaborates at Les Echos. Since 2011, he has been a member of the jury of the prix Saint-Germain.

Works

Novels and essais 
2001: Le Sourire des enfants morts, Les Belles Lettres
2002: Les Aventures extraordinaires de l'opéra, Les Belles lettres
2002: Fin de race, Flammarion, Prix Jacques-Bergier 2002.)
2002: Othon ou l'Aurore immobile, Les Belles lettres, Prix Roger-Nimier 2002
2003: Le Regard du poussin, Les Belles lettres
2003: Rue de l’autre monde, Le Masque
2004: Un été en Amérique, Flammarion
2005: La Sainte famille, Mille et une nuits
2005: Bulletin blanc ! : Autofriction, Éditions du Rocher
2007: Les Orphelins du mal, XO
2009: Les Derniers Jours de Paris, XO, Prix de la ville du Touquet
2009: Le Petit Néo de la conversation, JC Lattès
2010 Coup de fourchette, Éditions du Moteur, (reprint in Six façons de le dire, collective work with Yasmina Khadra, Sophie Adriansen, Mercedes Deambrosis, David Foenkinos, Christophe Ferré, Éditions du Moteur, 2011)
2010: Jacques Offenbach, Actes Sud, Prix de la ville de Deauville.
2011: Je pars à l’entracte, NiL Éditions, series "Les Affranchis"
2011: L’Enfant du premier matin, XO, Prix des Romancières 2012
2012: Les Fidélités successives, Albin Michel, Prix Cazes brasserie Lipp - Prix du feuilleton 2012 - Prix de Val d'Isère 2013
2012: Le Village de la fin du monde, Éditions Grasset
2014: La Dévoration, Albin Michel
2015: Dictionnaire amoureux de Paris, Plon, Prix Jean-Jacques Berger 2015 de l'Académie des Sciences Morales et Politiques - Prix de l'Académie Rabelais 2016.
2015: La Monnaie de Paris, 1150 ans d'histoire, Albin Michel

Short stories 
2003: Plaisir d'offrir, in anthology  (dir. Pierre Lagrange),

Prizes and distinctions 
2002: Prix Roger Nimier
2002: Prix Jacques Bergier
2009: Prix de la ville du Touquet
2010: Prix de la ville de Deauville
2012: Prix Cazes brasserie Lipp
2012: Prix des romancières
2012: Prix du feuilleton
2013: Prix de Val d'Isère
2015: Prix Jean-Jacques Berger of the Académie des Sciences Morales et Politiques
2016: Prix de l'Académie Rabelais

References

External links 
 Nicolas d'Estienne d'Orves on Fayard
 Nicolas D'Estienne d'Orves on France Inter
 Nicolas d'Estienne d'Orves : la ronde des bourreaux on Le Figaro culture
 Nicolas d’Estienne d’Orves on Iggy Book
 Nicolas d'Estienne d'Orves aime les salauds lumineux on Le Point
 Les séries de… Nicolas d’Estienne d’Orves on Le Figaro télé
 Personal website

People from Neuilly-sur-Seine
1974 births
21st-century French writers
21st-century French journalists
French music critics
Roger Nimier Prize winners
Prix des romancières recipients
Living people
Le Figaro people